The Necropolis of Cyrene  is a necropolis located between Cyrene, Libya and the ancient port of Apollonia, at the western slope of the Wadi Haleg Shaloof hill. It is around 10 square kilometres in size. With terraced archaic tombs, the cemetery is near the ancient road to Apollonia. The necropolis is today partially lost, parts were bulldozed in 2013. The UNESCO classified the site in 1982 as a World Heritage Site, and added Cyrene in 2017 to its List of World Heritage in Danger.

General

Earliest traces of Cyrene date back to about 700 BC, it is considered to be the oldest and largest Greek colony in eastern Libya. It is believed that the ancient, now extinct plant Silphium only grew in the Cyrene region.
In 2013 the local archaeology professor Ahmed Hussein from Bayda University noted:

James Hamilton described the Necropolis of Cyrene in his visit 1856:

Excavations
Excavations began in the 19th century, or earlier. Richard Norton excavated the site in 1911. Rowe, found fragments of a Ptolemaic cinerary urn, a Theia figure, and surveyed, excavated tombs there between 1952 and 1957. Rowe was the first to make an extensive archaeological study of the Necropolis of Cyrene, however, many artifacts from his excavations, and from Oliverio in 1925, are today considered to be lost. Burton Brown excavated two sarcophagi and a Roman burial in 1947. Beschi excavated two tombs in 1963.

Gallery

See also
Ancient Libya

References

Cemeteries in Libya
World Heritage Sites in Libya
Archaeological sites in Libya
Greek colonies in Libya
Temples of Apollo
Ancient Cyrenaica
Ancient Greek archaeological sites in Libya
Necropoleis